The 2022 Chevrolet Detroit Grand Prix was the seventh round of the 2022 IndyCar season. Held on June 5, 2022, in Detroit, Michigan at the Raceway at Belle Isle Park, the race consisted of 70 laps and was won by Will Power.

Entry list

Practice

Practice 1

Practice 2

Qualifying

Qualifying classification 

 Notes
 Bold text indicates fastest time set in session.

Warmup

Race 
The race started at 3:45 PM ET on June 5, 2022.

Race classification

Championship standings after the race 

Drivers' Championship standings

Engine manufacturer standings

 Note: Only the top five positions are included.

References

Chevrolet Detroit Grand Prix Grand Prix
Chevrolet Detroit Grand Prix Grand Prix
Chevrolet Detroit Grand Prix
Detroit Indy Grand Prix